Medtech or MedTech may refer to:
 Medical technology
 Medtech (medical education), a medical education facility founded in 2004 in Indianapolis, U.S.
 Medtech (robotic surgery), a medical robotics company founded in 2002 in Montpellier, France
 MedTech Europe, a Brussels-based trade association of the European medical technology industry
 Dornier Medtech, a former division of Dornier Flugzeugwerke
 Medtech Labs, a company founded in 1955 that was a founding joint venture partner in Prestige Brands
 Medical Technology Group, a not for profit organisation in the United Kingdom